The men's eight competition at the 2018 World Rowing Championships in Plovdiv took place at the Plovdiv Regatta Venue.

Schedule
The schedule was as follows:

All times are Eastern European Summer Time (UTC+3)

Results

Heats
The two fastest boats in each heat advanced directly to the A final. The remaining boats were sent to the repechage.

Heat 1

Heat 2

Repechage
The two fastest boats advanced to the A final. The remaining boats were sent to the B final.

Finals
The A final determined the rankings for places 1 to 6. Additional rankings were determined in the B final.

Final B

Final A

References

2018 World Rowing Championships